Delmer Ennis (June 8, 1925 – February 8, 1996) was an American professional baseball outfielder, who played in Major League Baseball (MLB) from 1946 to 1959 for the Philadelphia Phillies, St. Louis Cardinals, Cincinnati Reds, and Chicago White Sox. From 1949 to 1957, he accumulated more runs batted in (RBI) than anyone besides Stan Musial and was eighth in the National League (NL) in home runs. In 1950, Ennis led the NL with 126 RBI as the Phillies won their first pennant in 35 years. He held the Phillies career record of 259 home runs from 1956 to 1980, and ranked 10th in National League history with 1,824 games in the outfield, when his career ended.

Career
Ennis was born to George and Agnes Ennis in the Crescentville section of Philadelphia.  He played baseball and football at Olney High School and was mentioned as an all-state fullback.  The Philadelphia Phillies scout Jocko Collins came to watch one of Ennis's high school classmates pitch.  When Ennis hit two long home runs, Collins tried to recruit him but Ennis was hesitant, worried that he was not ready, and unsure that he wanted to pursue a baseball career.  In August 1942, Ennis finally signed with Collins to play with the Phillies Canadian–American League team, but the league suspended operation for World War II.  Ennis signed with Collins again in March 1943 and hit .348 with 19 home runs and 16 triples for the Phillies' Trenton, New Jersey Interstate League team.  In September 1943, Philadelphia wanted to call Ennis to the major leagues, but he went into the United States Navy instead.  Ennis saw military action in the Pacific Theater and also toured with a baseball team that included Billy Herman, Johnny Vander Meer and Schoolboy Rowe.

He joined the United States Navy on September 29, 1943, and was assigned to Sampson Naval Training Station, New York where he graduated as a signalman from "A" school at Sampson and then posted to the Hawaiian Sea Frontier. When the Navy learned that Ennis was associated with the Phillies, they assumed he was a major leaguer and invited him to fill one of the vacancies while in Honolulu. He was included on the Navy's Western PAC Tour of many Pacific Islands in 1944–1945. Ennis looked very good at the plate in the few exhibition games which immediately preceded the tours. His slugging prompted Dan Topping, new owner of the New York Yankees and a fellow serviceman at Pearl Harbor, to offer him $25,000 to sign with the Yanks. The Phillies had paid Ennis only $50 to sign.

His naval rank was Petty Officer Third Class. Most of his service was on the island of Guam after the winter tour. Playing with and against major leaguers on the tours was equivalent of a minor league apprenticeship for Ennis. After the tours he was assigned to a fleet recreation billet at Gab Gab Beach on Guam and stayed on the island for one year. He did not make it back to the States as soon as some of the others because he did not have enough points built up. He finally returned stateside through San Diego on the USS Wakefield. Ennis was discharged from the Navy on April 5, 1946, and joined the major league Phillies about a week later.

Player-manager Ben Chapman delayed Ennis's debut since he had missed spring training, and then had him pinch-hit on April 28 against the Boston Braves – a groundout to shortstop.  Chapman gave Ennis the starting job in left field, a weak spot in the Phillies lineup.  On May 5, Ennis hit his first home run – a three-run shot in the first inning – and then his second, both in the second game of a doubleheader.  His favorite moment was on Del's birthday, June 8, 1946, hitting a single to break up a perfect game with only four outs remaining against Red Barrett. Barrett of the Boston Braves had retired 22 batters in a row before Ennis' single. Olney residents held a Del Ennis Night at Shibe Park with 36,356 in attendance and an estimated 20,000 were turned away.  Ennis singled with the bases loaded to drive in two runs in the first inning against the Cardinals and the Phillies won.  His average raised over .300 until a slump in July.

In his early career, Ennis was noted not only for his home runs, runs batted in and hard line drives, but also good outfield play and fast, hard baserunning.  Eleven weeks after his debut, Ennis became the first Phillies rookie to make an All-Star team on the strength of a strong throwing arm and lively bat. He also became the first ever Sporting News Rookie Award winner, and finished eighth in the Most Valuable Player Award voting after batting .313 with 17 home runs and 73 RBI and placing second in the National League in slugging average (.485) behind Musial.

Ennis showed his power in 1948, driving in 95 runs with 30 home runs – a Phillies record for right-handed hitters, breaking Gavvy Cravath's 1915 total of 24. A year later, he hit .302 with 25 homers and 110 RBI, finishing second in the National League in doubles both seasons. But his most productive season came in 1950, when he hit .311 with career highs of 31 home runs and a league-best 126 RBI. The 31 home runs were the team record for right-handed hitters until teammate Stan Lopata hit 32 in 1956. As a member of the 1950 team dubbed the "Whiz Kids", Ennis helped the Phillies to win their first pennant since 1915 in a finish that saw Philadelphia beat out the Brooklyn Dodgers on the last day of the season, only to be swept in the World Series by the New York Yankees, with Ennis hitting only .143 with no RBI. Ennis placed fourth in the Most Valuable Player Award voting, won by teammate Jim Konstanty.

From 1952 to 1955, Ennis collected four 20+ home run, 100+ RBI seasons, with highs of 29 and 125 in 1953. He was also named to three All-Star games, in 1946, 1951 and 1955. In 1956, he passed Chuck Klein to become the Phillies all-time home run leader, holding the record until Mike Schmidt passed him in 1980. On August 25, 1955, before a doubleheader with St. Louis, the Phillies honored Ennis for driving in more runs at that point than any player in team history. Ennis was presented with gifts including a Cadillac, TV, air conditioner, freezer, diamond ring, and fishing outfit. The Phillies won both games with Ennis adding four RBI to his record total.

The Philadelphia native became the first Phillies player in the modern era to reach 1,000 runs batted in on August 9, 1955. Connie Mack Stadium was sold out for Del Ennis Night later that month (38,545). Ennis’ 259 home runs with the Phillies rank third in franchise history behind Mike Schmidt (548) and Ryan Howard (382). His 1,124 RBIs rank third among modern Phillies behind only Schmidt (1,595) and Howard (1,194). No wonder Phillies broadcasters Gene Kelly and By Saam said, “It’s Ding Dong Del” or “Here comes Ennis the Menace” whenever he stepped to the plate, according to SABR.org.

In 1956, he broke Ed Delahanty's record of 1,544 games with the Phillies. By the end of the 1956 season, he was also among the National League's top ten career home run leaders, though he dropped out of the top ten before his career ended. Traded to the St. Louis Cardinals before the 1957 season for Rip Repulski, Ennis responded with a .286 average, 26 home runs and 105 RBI, finishing second in the league behind his teammate and roommate on the road Stan Musial. But his production dropped off sharply in 1958, and after two years in St. Louis he finished his career in 1959 playing for the Cincinnati Redlegs and the pennant-winning Chicago White Sox. Despite hitting 12 home runs and driving in 35 runs batted in during spring training for Cincinnati in 1959, Ennis was traded to the Chicago White Sox on May 1 for pitcher Don Rudolph and outfielder Lou Skizas.

In a 14-season career, Ennis compiled a .284 batting average with 288 home runs, 2,063 hits, 1,284 RBI and 985 runs in 1,903 games. Defensively, Ennis recorded a career .969 fielding percentage.

The story of Ennis and the abuse he endured from Philadelphia fans has obscured his impressive statistics and also his memory. Oft noted was the fans' animosity beginning with a slump year in 1951.  Despite turning the record around later, the fans were merciless.   As an example, in the second game of a doubleheader against the Cardinals on July 31, 1954, in the top of the third inning, Ennis dropped an outfield fly with the bases loaded and all three runners scored.  As Phillies' pitcher Steve Ridzik later remarked, "We had a packed house and the fans start to boo him unmercifully. It was terrible. The next inning when he went out to left field they booed and booed and booed. They booed him when he ran off the field at the end of the inning. . . .Here he is ... a hometown guy and everything. . . . He came to bat in the last of the eighth inning with the score still tied and two outs. The fans just booed and booed and all our guys on the bench are just hotter than a pistol. We were ready to fight the thirty-some thousand."   In the bottom half of the same inning with two on and two out, he hit the first pitch on the roof in left field at Connie Mack Stadium, and the Phillies won the game by a score of 6–5.

Ennis' career ended with a mid-season release by the White Sox in 1959, after having been acquired from Cincinnati during the first week of the 1959 season. On May 1, he was traded to the White Sox, helmed by Al López, where Ennis became the starting left fielder throughout May into early June 1959. In the first 11 games with the White Sox, Ennis drove in seven runs including a game-winner in mid-May at Yankee Stadium. In fact, Ennis had four game-winning hits in six games in early 1959 and the White Sox went on to win the AL pennant. However, Ennis was not with the team that played the Dodgers in the 1959 World Series, although he was voted a one-fourth WS share after it. To make room on the roster for Norm Cash, who had completed his military service commitment, Ennis was waived by the Sox in mid-June 1959, thus ending a career spanning 14 seasons.

His defensive replacement for the White Sox in that period was Johnny Callison, who later was traded to and starred with the Phillies.

With Chicago, Ennis batted .219, with 2 home runs, 7 runs batted in with 96 at bats. The White Sox released Ennis on June 20. They called up Jim McAnany to play right field and moved Al Smith from right field to left field for the balance of the season. With personal problems in his family, Ennis needed to return to Philadelphia.

Following his retirement as a player, Ennis operated a bowling alley named Del Ennis Lanes in Huntingdon Valley, Pennsylvania, with the former traveling secretary of the Phillies, John Wise. He also bred greyhound race dogs. Ennis also spent a year coaching baseball at  Penn State University's Abington Campus (formerly Ogontz campus).  He remembered his 1950 Phillies days in his sports enterprise, calling three dogs scheduled to run in Florida racetracks Whiz Kids Ennis, Whiz Kids Ashburn and Whiz Kids Roberts. In 1983, during the franchise's 100th anniversary year, he was named to the Philadelphia Phillies Centennial Team. There is now a plaque on the Phillies Wall of Fame at the team's ballpark honoring the career of Ennis as a Whiz Kid.

Recollections

"I really didn't expect to stay with the Phillies but they had to give me a 30-day trial because I was on the National Defense List. I never had spring training [in 1946] and I pinch hit in Pittsburgh in my first game, then I got into the starting lineup. In my second game in left field, I hit a bases loaded double to beat the Pirates. A few days later in Chicago against the Cubs, I hit two homers in one game"

Ennis used to treat his bats with great care: "I used to hang out at a gas station at Rising Sun and Van Kirk in the Crescentville section of Philadelphia called the Gas House. I used to take home a dozen bats at the end of each year. I would fill up one of those big drums with linseed oil and leave the bats in the drum all winter. They would get to be about 40–42 ounces and when I got to Florida for spring training, I put the bats in the dryer where they dried uniforms. That would get them down to about 36 ounces, and make them harder. Andy Seminick and I used the same bat all year in 1950 when we won the NL pennant."

On Ennis's best day as a Phillie – he hit three home runs and knocked in seven runs – he happened to pop out his fourth time up. "They booed the daylights out of me", he remembers.

"Now a pitcher can't go out of his way to hit somebody, he can't knock you down, and when we played we didn't wear helmets. They'd tell you they were going to put one in your ear and when you looked back and saw the catcher's glove by your head you got the idea you shouldn't take a toehold." – Del Ennis in Baseball Digest (July 1975)

Ennis popped up with the bases loaded sending Cardinals Manager Fred Hutchinson into a slow burn. After he dropped his bat into the rack, Hutchinson fetched it. He angrily took a swing at the concrete dugout steps. Nothing happened. Two more swings produced nothing more than dents in the bat. Hutch calmly walked to where Ennis sat and dropped the bat at his feet. Keep it, he said. "It's got good wood".

Ennis died in Huntingdon Valley, Pennsylvania, at 70 years of age from complications of diabetes. He was buried in Hillside Cemetery, Roslyn, Pennsylvania.

Feats
On June 2, 1949, the Phillies hit five home runs during the same inning (the eighth) in a 12–3 victory over Cincinnati at Shibe Park, tying the major league mark set by the 1939 New York Giants. Andy Seminick hit two home runs in the inning, while Ennis, Willie Jones and Schoolboy Rowe had one each. Jones added a triple and Granny Hamner's double made the total of extra bases 18, still a record. Also in 1949, Ennis ended a scoreless tie with the St Louis Cards in the 9th inning with a home run off P Max Lanier to win the game.
 Ennis hit a leadoff solo HR in September 1952 in the bottom of the 17th inning as the Phillies beat Boston by a score of 7–6 in the first game of a doubleheader at Shibe Park.
 Ennis drove in six runs in a game with the Reds at Crosley Field on July 30, 1953.
 Opening day in 1956 in Pittsburgh and the game is washed out by rain as Ennis has 5 runs batted in to no avail. He finishes the season of 1956 with 95, the first year in five he misses the 100 RBI mark.
 He had a three home run game on July 23, 1955, at Connie Mack Stadium and drove in all 7 runs – one short of George Kelly's National League mark set in 1924 – the Phillies beating the Cards 7–2 as Robin Roberts wins his 16th season victory and 6th in a row.
 Three times in his career Ennis broke up no-hit games, including one off Ramón Monzant of the New York Giants on April 29, 1956. In 1946, his two out 8th inning single spoiled a no hit perfect game bid by Red Barrett of the Cardinals and in 1947 he broke up a no hit bid by Hal Gregg of the Dodgers.
 Ennis had 1,029 RBI after only his tenth major league season. The only players who had ever driven in more runs during their first ten seasons, prior to Ennis were Joe DiMaggio (1,277 RBI / 1936–48), Al Simmons (1,276 RBI / 1924–33), Ted Williams (1,261 RBI / 1939–51), Lou Gehrig (1,144 RBI / 1923–32), Johnny Mize (1,096 RBI / 1936–48), Earl Averill (1,077 RBI / 1929–38), Jim Bottomley (1,057 RBI / 1922–31), Joe Medwick (1,047 RBI / 1932–41), Chuck Klein (1,041 RBI / 1928–37), and Bob Johnson (1,040 RBI / 1933–42).

1950 highlights
Ennis' salary for 1950 was $30,000, at the time the highest ever paid to a member of the Phillies. Ennis hit home runs in four straight games twice in the 1950 season. In 11 seasons as a Phillies outfielder in the post World War II years, Ennis averaged better than 23 home runs and 100 runs batted in and was the key player on the 1950 pennant winning team.
July 27 – Ennis hit a double and a grand slam with seven RBI against the Chicago Cubs, as the Phillies won 13–3 at Shibe Park. Philadelphia won 11 of their next 15 games to hold first place by four games over the Boston Braves.
July 30 – In the first game of a doubleheader, he hit his second grand slam in three days in a 10–0 win over Pittsburgh Pirates. He added a two-run homer as the Phillies won the second game, 4–2. His seven RBI in two games gave him 41 for the month, a new Phillies mark.
August 16 – The Phillies beat the second-place Braves 5–1 on Robin Roberts' three-hitter, scoring four runs in the fourth inning off Vern Bickford including Ennis' 26th home run of the season.
August 21 – The Phillies beat the New York Giants as Ennis had three hits and drove in his 100th run of the season to bolster Curt Simmons' four-hit shutout for his 16th win of the season. Philadelphia heads west with a  game lead in the National League pennant race.
September 15 – In a doubleheader against Cincinnati, Ennis went 5-for-10, including a three-RBI double in the 18th inning of game two, as the Phillies won both games.
September 24 – As the Phillies near the end of a pennant season, Ennis powered the faltering "Whiz Kids" past the Boston Braves with a home run, three singles, and four RBI in an 8–7 win.

See also
List of Major League Baseball career hits leaders
List of Major League Baseball career home run leaders
 List of Major League Baseball career runs batted in leaders
 List of Major League Baseball annual runs batted in leaders

Notes

External links

Del Ennis at SABR (Baseball BioProject)

1925 births
1996 deaths
Baseball players from Philadelphia
Chicago White Sox players
Cincinnati Reds players
Deaths from diabetes
Major League Baseball left fielders
Major League Baseball right fielders
National League All-Stars
National League RBI champions
Philadelphia Phillies players
St. Louis Cardinals players
Trenton Packers players
United States Navy sailors
United States Navy personnel of World War II